The 2016 Nicky Rackard Cup was the 12th staging of the Nicky Rackard Cup hurling championship since its establishment by the Gaelic Athletic Association in 2005. The competition began on Saturday 23 April 2016 and ended on Saturday 4 June 2016.

Roscommon were the 2015 champions and were promoted to the Christy Ring Cup.

On 4 June 2016, Mayo won the Nicky Rackard Cup following a 2-16 to 1-15 defeat of Armagh. It was their first Nicky Rackard Cup title.

Tyrone's Damian Casey was the championship's top scorer with 2-40.

Format

The 2016 Nicky Rackard Cup is played in a double-elimination format. For clarity, the draw details are detailed in each round below.

Round 1

All eight teams play in Round 1.

Round 2A

Contested by the four winners of Round 1.

Round 2B

Contested by the four losers of Round 1.

Quarter-finals

 
The two losers of round 2A (who won a match and lost a match) play the two winners of round 2B (who lost a match and won a match). These two matches are referred to as quarter-finals.

Semi-finals

The winners of round 2A play the winners of the two quarter-finals.

Final

Christy Ring/Nicky Rackard Relegation/Promotion

The bottom team in this year's Christy Ring Cup (tier 2) plays the winner of this year's Nicky Rackard Cup (tier 3).

Nicky Rackard/Lory Meagher play-offs

Bottom play-off

Contested by the two losers from round 2B. Both these teams lost their first two matches.

Relegation/Promotion play-off

The bottom team in this year's Nicky Rackard Cup (tier 3) plays the winner of this year's Lory Meagher Cup (tier 4).

Scoring statistics

Overall

Top scorer in a single game

References

Nicky Rackard Cup
Nicky Rackard Cup